Jeopardy! is an American television game show. Its format is a quiz competition in which contestants are presented with general-knowledge clues in the form of answers and must phrase their responses as questions. Many contestants in the show's history have received significant media attention because of their success on Jeopardy!, particularly Brad Rutter, who has won the most money on the show and was undefeated by a human until 2020; Ken Jennings, who has the show's longest winning streak; James Holzhauer, who holds several of the show's highest overall daily scores; Amy Schneider, who has the second-longest win streak; and Matt Amodio, with the third-longest winning streak. Other contestants have been better known for their accomplishments elsewhere, such as John McCain, a one-day champion in 1965 who later became a U.S. senator and the 2008 Republican presidential nominee.

1964–1979

John McCain

U.S. senator and 2008 presidential candidate John McCain (1936–2018) was a one-day champion in 1965 before serving in the Vietnam war, spending five and a half years as a POW, and later becoming a senator for Arizona.

Red Gibson

Hutton "Red" Gibson (1918–2020) won the 1968 Tournament of Champions. Gibson later became a prominent sedevacantist and conspiracy theorist. One of his sons is actor, director and producer Mel Gibson.

Jay Wolpert

Jay Wolpert (1942–2022) won the 1969 Tournament of Champions. He later became known as a game show producer, screenwriter, and occasional actor.

1984–present

Chuck Forrest 

Chuck Forrest (born June 3, 1961) held the record for the largest non-tournament cash winnings total from 1985 to 1989, and the largest all-time winnings from 1986 to 1990. The show's producers regarded him as one of the best and most memorable contestants of the 1980s. Forrest is widely regarded by other elite Jeopardy! players as one of the most formidable contestants ever. He won five consecutive games from September 30 to October 4, 1985, winning a then-record $72,800 and qualifying for the 1986 Tournament of Champions, which he won, earning another $100,000. Forrest later played in the Super Jeopardy! tournament, the Million Dollar Masters tournament, the Ultimate Tournament of Champions, and the Battle of the Decades tournament. He implemented a strategy known as the "Forrest Bounce" to confuse opponents: the strategy involved picking each clue from a different category instead of taking the clues in order. With Mark Lowenthal, Forrest co-wrote the 1992 book Secrets of the Jeopardy! Champions.

Richard Cordray

Richard Cordray (born May 3, 1959) was an undefeated five-time Jeopardy! champion in 1987, who appeared in the 1987 Tournament of Champions while still serving as a law clerk. Cordray parlayed his success on Jeopardy! into political office, serving as an Ohio State Legislator, the Attorney General of Ohio, and later the first director of the Consumer Financial Protection Bureau. He was a participant in the Battle of the Decades Tournament, but lost in his first match and declined the prize money due to his office.

Mark Lowenthal

Mark M. Lowenthal was an undefeated five-time champion in 1988 and won the 1988 Tournament of Champions. He also appeared on Super Jeopardy!, the Ultimate Tournament of Champions, winning $5,000 after losing his first game, and the Jeopardy! Battle of the Decades, beating Frank Spangenberg in his initial game. Lowenthal is the co-author (with Season 2 record-setting five-time champion and Tournament of Champions winner Chuck Forrest) of the 1992 book Secrets of the Jeopardy! Champions, and has also written a college textbook on intelligence and national security.

Frank Spangenberg

Lieutenant Frank Spangenberg (born July 26, 1957) garnered fame in 1990 when he set the five-day cumulative winnings record, becoming the first person to win more than $100,000 in five days on the show. He has been called one of the "veritable legends" of the show. He was also the first to exceed $30,000 (winning $30,600) in a single day.

At the time a member of the New York City Transit Police Department (now the Transit Bureau of the New York City Police Department), Spangenberg won $102,597 in five days. Until 2003, winners were retired after five consecutive victories and due to a winnings cap in place at the time, Spangenberg kept $75,000 of his winnings and donated the remaining $27,597 to the Gift of Love Hospice, a facility operated by the Missionaries of Charity.

Until 2019, the $102,597 record stood as the all-time net five-day record because of 2001 changes to clue values and the 2003 abolition of the five-day limit. The only contestant to date to beat Spangenberg's record is James Holzhauer, who won $298,687 in his first five games.

Spangenberg also won Jeopardy! 10th Anniversary Tournament in 1993, winning $41,800, and previously appeared in the 1990 Tournament of Champions and Super Jeopardy! earlier that year. He later competed in the 2002 Million Dollar Masters tournament, the 2005 Ultimate Tournament of Champions and the 2014 Battle of the Decades tournament.

Jerome Vered

Jerome Vered (born March 13, 1958) appeared on Jeopardy! in 1992 and won $96,801 as a five-day champion, retiring undefeated. His total winnings at the time were second only to Spangenberg's $102,597. During that run, he shattered the one-day record for dollar winnings, earning $34,000 in one episode. After his run, Vered returned for the 1992 Tournament of Champions, finishing third. In the 2005 Jeopardy! Ultimate Tournament of Champions, Vered won five games to advance to a three-game final match against fellow Jeopardy! legends Ken Jennings and Brad Rutter. He finished in third place, earning $250,000. He competed in the 2014 Battle of the Decades, losing to Tom Cubbage.

Michael George Dupée

Michael George Dupée (born October 23, 1966) originally appeared on Jeopardy! in 1996, and won the Tournament of Champions that year. In 2005, Dupée participated in the Ultimate Tournament of Champions. He won his first match, but lost to Robert Slaven in the second. Nine years later, in 2014, Dupée competed in the Jeopardy! Battle of the Decades tournament, where he was defeated by Brad Rutter.

Dupée's total winnings on Jeopardy! are $203,901, including $66,401 won during his original five-day run; $100,000 for winning the 1996 Tournament of Champions; $32,500 from the Ultimate Tournament of Champions; and $5,000 from the show's Battle of the Decades. Jennings praised Dupée's book, How to Get on Jeopardy! and Win!, claiming it was the best preparation for competing on Jeopardy! In the book, which he wrote after his success on Jeopardy!, Dupée wrote about his experience on the show and provided practice clues for aspiring contestants.

Karl Coryat

Karl Coryat was a two-day champion on the show in 1996. His name was given to the Coryat score, an analytics measurement of a contestant's ability to answer questions alone, without factoring in wagers on Daily Doubles or Final Jeopardy!.

Arthur Phillips

American novelist Arthur Phillips (born April 23, 1969) appeared on Jeopardy! in 1997. According to his biography, Phillips was a 5-time undefeated champion, winning $63,003 in the process. He competed in the 1998 Tournament of Champions, but lost his quarterfinal match to Teen Tournament winner Sahir Islam. In 2005, Phillips competed in the Jeopardy! Ultimate Tournament of Champions. He won his first match, winning $8,800 (which was bumped to $15,000), and lost his second, finishing behind Eric Terzuolo and former College Championship winner Pam Mueller.

Bob Harris

Bob Harris (born October 15, 1963) is a multi-time contestant on Jeopardy! Harris first appeared as a contestant in 1997 and won $58,000 as an undefeated five-time champion. The next year, he finished third in the Tournament of Champions, behind Kim Worth and Dan Melia. In the first round of the Jeopardy! Million Dollar Masters tournament in 2002, Harris scored an upset victory over Rachael Schwartz and Frank Spangenberg. He lost in the semifinals to Eric Newhouse. In 2005, Harris competed again on the show, this time in the Jeopardy! Ultimate Tournament of Champions. He won $24,400 and defeated fellow Jeopardy! alumni Frank Epstein and Tom Cubbage in Round 1, but lost in Round 2 to Bruce Borchardt and Michael Daunt. In 2014, Harris competed in the Battle of the Decades. In his match, he finished third, behind Shane Whitlock and Robin Carroll.

Harris wrote a book about his experiences on Jeopardy!, Prisoner of Trebekistan. He has competed on other game shows. In 2000, he participated in a million-dollar winning team on Greed, winning $200,000 for himself. He was also a successful $250,000 phone-a-friend for a contestant on Who Wants to Be a Millionaire.

Eddie Timanus

Eddie Timanus (born August 9, 1968) was the first blind contestant to compete on the show, appearing in October 1999. He won five consecutive games—the limit at that time—and earned $69,700 and two cars. He subsequently appeared in the Million Dollar Masters, the Ultimate Tournament of Champions, and the Battle of the Decades.

Brad Rutter

Brad Rutter (born January 31, 1978) is the biggest all-time money winner on Jeopardy! and briefly held the record for biggest cumulative game show winnings for any U.S. game show contestant. Rutter retained the record for Jeopardy! winnings with either $4,255,102 (or $4,270,102, including a pair of Chevrolet Camaros). He became a five-day undefeated champion on Jeopardy! in 2000, with a total of $55,102. He subsequently won four Jeopardy! tournament titles: the 2001 Tournament of Champions, the 2002 Million Dollar Masters Tournament, the 2005 Ultimate Tournament of Champions, and the 2014 Battle of the Decades.

In 2020, his undefeated streak ended when he finished third in the Jeopardy! The Greatest of All Time tournament, losing to Jennings and Holzhauer by a final score of 3–1–0.

Ken Jennings

Ken Jennings (born May 23, 1974) first appeared on Jeopardy! on June 2, 2004, shortly after producers of the show eliminated the five-show cap for contestants. Because the five-game limit was removed, Jennings continued to win and eventually broke the winnings record set by Tom Walsh, who had won $186,900 in 2004.

Jennings set a record of 74 wins before he was defeated by Nancy Zerg in his 75th appearance. His total winnings from the program amount to $3,022,700, which includes $2,522,700 won in his initial appearances and an additional $500,000 for his second-place finish in the Jeopardy! Ultimate Tournament of Champions. In addition, at the end of Season 20, he set a one-day record of $75,000, which was later broken by Roger Craig, and even later by James Holzhauer.

During his first run of Jeopardy! appearances, Jennings earned the record for the highest American game show winnings. His total was later surpassed by Brad Rutter, who defeated Jennings in the finals of the Ultimate Tournament of Champions, adding $2,000,000 to his earlier Jeopardy! winnings. Jennings regained the record after appearing on several other game shows, including appearances on 1 vs. 100 and Grand Slam, culminating in an appearance on Are You Smarter Than a 5th Grader? in which he won $500,000. Rutter retained the Jeopardy! record by defeating Jennings in the finals of the Battle of the Decades tournament.

After his success on Jeopardy!, Jennings wrote of his experience and explored American trivia history and culture in Brainiac: Adventures in the Curious, Competitive, Compulsive World of Trivia Buffs, published in 2006.

Jennings returned to Jeopardy! finishing runner-up to the Watson Supercomputer (splitting $300,000 with a charity) and again for the Battle of the Decades where he finished runner-up to Rutter again (winning $100,000). Jennings's total winnings amount to $3,422,700.

His team finished runner-up in the 2019 Jeopardy! All-Star Games relay tournament. In 2020, he won the Jeopardy! The Greatest of All Time primetime event, which thus gave him his first Jeopardy tournament title and an additional $1,000,000 in winnings.

In September 2020, as host Alex Trebek's pancreatic cancer progressed, Jennings became a consulting producer for Jeopardy!, a role that included reading select on-air categories. When Trebek died in November 2020, Jennings was named the first interim guest host of the program. His episodes began airing in January 2021. In July 2022, Jennings became a permanent host of the show, along with Mayim Bialik.

David Madden

David Madden (born June 13, 1981) won the fourth-highest number of games on Jeopardy! in non-tournament gameplay, winning 19 games and $432,400 between July 5 and September 19, 2005. As of April 2019, Madden ranked fourth in consecutive game wins (James Holzhauer, Julia Collins, and Ken Jennings) and also fifth in dollar winnings from regular games (Jennings, Holzhauer, Matt Amodio, and Jason Zuffranieri). In the 2006 Tournament of Champions, Madden won his first match (defeating the eventual winner of the Tournament, Michael Falk), but failed to win his second-round match, taking home a consolation prize of $10,000 and bringing his total to $442,400. Madden was invited to take part in 2014's Battle of the Decades Jeopardy! event, but declined to participate due to contractual issues. However, he was again invited and able to take part in its 2019 All-Star Games tournament, featuring 18 past champions. Madden was the seventh out of twelve picks in the All-Star Games Draft in September 2018, thus becoming a member of "Team Brad" along with his former Princeton University Quiz Bowl teammate Larissa Kelly, the 6th pick in the draft. Team Brad won its first-round match and in the final episode, airing on March 5, 2019, won the All-Star Games Tournament grand prize of $1,000,000, which was split between the three team members. After Madden's share of the prize was received, his all-time Jeopardy! earnings totaled $775,733.33, which as of March 2019 ranked third all-time behind Rutter and Jennings.

Larissa Kelly

Larissa Kelly (born February 10, 1980) won a total of $222,597 over six games and $1,000 third place consolation prize in her seventh game, with her last appearance airing May 28, 2008. At the time of her run on the program, Kelly was the highest-winning female contestant and ranked fifth in all-time in Jeopardy! earnings (excluding tournament winnings).

In addition to previously being the highest-winning female contestant in regular play, Kelly broke Ken Jennings's record for most money won in five days by winning $179,797. Kelly is also the third-highest-winning female contestant in any single game in Jeopardy!'''s history, as her $45,200 performance trails Maria Wenglinsky, who won $46,600 on November 1, 2005, and Emma Boettcher, who won $46,801 on June 3, 2019, after upsetting long-running champion James Holzhauer.

Kelly's husband and sister were also contestants. Her husband fell to Jennings and her sister to Aaron Schroeder, the victors being later finalists in the 2009 Tournament of Champions. She appeared again in the 2019 Jeopardy! All-Star Games team tournament with Madden on Rutter's winning team.

Roger Craig

Roger Craig set a then one-day Jeopardy! winnings record of $77,000 during his second appearance on the show in September 2010. Craig won the Tournament of Champions the next year, and in the process set a then record for largest daily double (unadjusted) in Jeopardy! history.

He appeared again in the 2019 Jeopardy! All-Star Games relay tournament with 2013 Teen Tournament champion Leonard Cooper on Rogers's team.

Watson

Watson is a "deep question answering system" built by IBM to play Jeopardy! Watson was in a two-game, three-day exhibition match against Ken Jennings and Brad Rutter that aired February 14–16, 2011. Watson won the match with a total of $77,147.

Matthew Kish
Matthew Kish, an American educator, made headlines in 2012 when he won an episode of the popular quiz show Jeopardy. Kish, who was then a high school teacher of psychology and American history at North Royalton High School in Ohio, competed on the show as part of the Teachers Tournament. Kish's Jeopardy victory was widely celebrated by his students and colleagues, who were thrilled to see their teacher excel in such a high-profile competition. In an interview with Cleveland.com, Kish credited his success on the show to his background in teaching, which had given him a broad range of knowledge on a variety of subjects. During his appearance on Jeopardy, Kish demonstrated his mastery of trivia across a range of categories, including history, literature, and science. He also impressed viewers with his quick reflexes and ability to buzz in with the correct answers before his competitors. Kish's victory on Jeopardy brought attention to North Royalton High School and highlighted the quality of education provided by its faculty. His success on the show also inspired his students, who saw firsthand how their teacher's dedication to learning and knowledge could lead to success. In the years since his Jeopardy win, Kish has continued to teach at North Royalton High School, where he remains a respected and beloved member of the faculty. His victory on the show serves as a testament to the power of education and the impact that dedicated educators can have on their students.  

Colby Burnett

Colby Burnett was the first Jeopardy! contestant to win both the Teachers Tournament and the Tournament of Champions. A teacher at Fenwick High School in Oak Park, Illinois, Burnett won the Teachers Tournament in November 2012. In February 2013, he won the show's Tournament of Champions, taking home the $250,000 grand prize. He later appeared on season 3 of TBS's reality game show King of the Nerds. Burnett is known for competing wearing oversized suits, sometimes with jackets that stretch all the way down to his knees.

He appeared in the 2019 Jeopardy! All-Star Games relay tournament with his team and finished third behind Brad Rutter's and Ken Jennings's teams.

Arthur Chu

Arthur Chu (born January 30, 1984) first appeared on Jeopardy! on January 28, 2014, and almost immediately became a lightning rod because of his unusual playing style. His game theory, "Forrest Bounce", and furious pressing of the signaling device made him one of the show's most controversial contestants. As of January 31, 2021, Chu ranks eighth on the list of all-time highest-earning Jeopardy! non-tournament champions, with an 11-day total of $297,200. His winning streak came to a close when he lost his 12th game but won $1,000 for finishing in third place, leaving him with a final total of $298,200. After his initial appearance on the show, Chu competed in the 2014 Jeopardy! Tournament of Champions, finishing second to Ben Ingram, an IT consultant from South Carolina. Chu won $100,000 for his second-place finish, bringing his overall winnings to $398,200.

Julia Collins

Julia Collins (born 1982) had the fifth-longest streak of consecutive victories, behind Ken Jennings, Amy Schneider, Matt Amodio, and James Holzhauer, with 20 wins and $429,100, until Mattea Roach surpassed her wins total on May 3, 2022. She was the second person to win 20 games in a row. In the 2014 Jeopardy! Tournament of Champions she finished second in her quarterfinal game against Joshua Brakhage and 2013 College Champion Jim Coury, but reached the semifinals as a wild card. She then won her semifinal game, advancing to the finals, where she finished third, behind Ben Ingram and Arthur Chu.

Collins appeared again in the 2019 Jeopardy! All-Star Games relay tournament with Ben Ingram and Seth Wilson.

Alex Jacob

Alex Jacob (born October 27, 1984), is a former professional poker player who lives in Chicago, Illinois, and worked as a currency trader for the Gelber Group. In 2015, Jacob won six games and the 2015 Tournament of Champions. In a Final Jeopardy round where Jacob did not need any additional money to win the game, he humorously wrote "What is Aleve?", mimicking the slogan of one of the show's regular advertisers.

Jacob appeared again in the 2019 Jeopardy! All-Star Games relay tournament with 2015 Teachers Tournament champion Jennifer Giles on Buzzy Cohen's team.

Matt Jackson

Matt Jackson (born June 24, 1992), 13-time champion, surpassed Arthur Chu's 11-game winning streak with his 12th win on October 12, 2015. He has also beat Chu in regular season cash earnings with a total of $413,612. He competed in the 2015 Jeopardy! Tournament of Champions, finishing second to Alex Jacob.

Jackson appeared again in the 2019 Jeopardy! All-Star Games relay tournament alongside Ken Jennings and 2012 College Championship winner Monica Thieu.

Buzzy Cohen

Austin David "Buzzy" Cohen, a recording industry executive from Los Angeles, won $164,603 over nine games in April and May 2016. Many of his victories were guaranteed victories, which allowed Cohen to wager nothing and use his final response to make jokes about Alex Trebek, which earned him both praise and disdain from Jeopardy! fans.People are losing their minds over this "Jeopardy!" champion. BuzzFeed. Retrieved May 25, 2016. He returned for the 2017 Tournament of Champions, which he won, collecting the grand prize of $250,000.

Cohen appeared again in the 2019 Jeopardy! All-Star Games relay tournament.

After Trebek's death, Cohen hosted the May 2021 Jeopardy! Tournament of Champions.

Austin Rogers
Austin Tyler Rogers (born November 27, 1978) is a bartender from New York City who earned $445,000 over the course of 13 shows in 2017. Described by one account as "Krameresque" and by Trebek himself as "outside the box, completely different from what many viewers expect a 'Jeopardy!' contestant to be," Rogers is known for his flair and quirky poses, pantomiming humorous actions when being introduced. Although he does not own a television set, he prepared for qualification by watching a lot of Jeopardy! episodes and knowing its tricks. Before James Holzhauer, he was the only contestant with two of the top ten one-day totals: $69,000 on October 3, 2017 (third place) and $65,600 on October 2, 2017 (seventh place). In the 2017 Tournament of Champions, Rogers finished third behind Buzzy Cohen and second-place finisher Alan Lin. All three finalists (including Seth Wilson) appeared at the Jeopardy! All-Star Games tournament relay in 2019. Rogers was also a contestant on Cash Cab. He won $2,400 with one other rider doubling their winnings on the video bonus at the end of the trip.

Jackie Fuchs

Jackie Fuchs, an attorney and former musician who was a bassist for The Runaways under her stage name Jackie Fox, appeared on Jeopardy! as a regular contestant in December 2018. She won four games, accumulating $87,089 in winnings.

James Holzhauer

James Holzhauer (born July 1984), a professional sports gambler from Las Vegas, Nevada, and a native of Naperville, Illinois, set the single-game Jeopardy! winnings record of $110,914 during his fourth appearance on the show in April 2019, beating the previous record of $77,000 held by Roger Craig. He eclipsed his own record on April 17 with a final single-game total of $131,127. He holds the top 16 single-game winnings records. At $25,000, he also exceeded Philip Tiu's prior record of $19,000 for largest successful Daily Double wager. At $60,013, he exceeded his own prior record of $38,314 for largest successful Final Jeopardy wager of all time.

Before Holzhauer, the record for largest successful Final Jeopardy wager was $34,000, held by Austin Rogers. His $298,687 total winnings across his first five days also surpassed the five-day record set in 1990 by Frank Spangenberg (when adjusted for the changes in the values of the clues)—the only contestant to do so. He is now the second-highest winning contestant in regular game (non-tournament) winnings, surpassed only by Ken Jennings. In addition to an aggressive wagering strategy, Holzhauer also goes for the highest values on the board first to amass his totals quickly, making it more difficult for his opponents to catch up, and increasing the money he has available to wager when he hits a Daily Double.

Holzhauer lost on June 3, 2019, to Emma Boettcher, making his 32 wins the fourth-longest streak in show history, and his total winnings of $2,462,216 the second-highest in regular-season play. He also had won the third-most money overall on the show as of June 6, 2019, and, counting winnings on all game shows, is third overall after winning the Tournament of Champions in a rematch with Boettcher. He then went on to participate in the Jeopardy! The Greatest of All Time primetime event, winning one of four matches and finishing second overall behind Jennings.

Holzhauer has a Bachelor of Science in liberal arts & sciences major in mathematics from the University of Illinois at Urbana-Champaign, where he graduated in 2005. Before his performance on Jeopardy!, he was on two other television game shows: The Chase on September 2, 2014, and 500 Questions on May 22, 2015. Of the two shows, he had the greater success on The Chase. In the final Chase round (as team leader with two other contestants participating), he defeated Mark Labbett ("The Beast") with a score of 26–9, splitting a prize of $175,000 with his team.

 Matt Amodio 

Matt Amodio, a PhD student in computer science at Yale University and a native of Medina County, Ohio, won $1,518,601 during his 38 consecutive wins on the show, making him the third millionaire contestant (based on regular-season play) after Jennings and Holzhauer. He is the third-highest earner of all time in regular-season play, has won the third-highest number of consecutive games, and is the fourth-biggest all-time winner. During season 37, Amodio qualified as the second seed in the next Tournament of Champions. Amodio is noted for his strategy of consistently prefacing his responses with "What's" instead of adjusting the interrogative pronoun to fit the response. He chose this method because Jeopardy! rules allow any question containing the correct response to be used; by not having to adjust the pronoun, he has one less thing to think about when formulating a response, potentially speeding response time. He has credited Wikipedia's format for allowing him to meander through various topics in a random but logical progression and learn content quickly. His 38-game winning streak is often called "The Amodio Rodeo".

 Amy Schneider  

Amy Schneider, an engineering manager from Oakland, California, won $1,382,800 and 40 games in a row, the second-longest winning streak in Jeopardy!s history and the fourth-highest winnings in regular-season play. Schneider is the fifth-biggest all-time winner, and the fourth regular-season millionaire (after Jennings, Holzhauer, and Amodio), while being the first transgender and female one. During season 38, she qualified as the first seed in the next Tournament of Champions.On November 21, she won the tournament, along with its $250,000 grand prize. She was the first openly transgender person to compete in, and to win, the Jeopardy! Tournament of Champions. Of the significance of her gender identity, she said: "The fact is, I don't actually think about being trans all that often, and so when appearing on national television, I wanted to represent that part of my identity accurately: as important, but also relatively minor."

 Mattea Roach 

Mattea Roach, a tutor living in Toronto, Ontario, and originally from Halifax, Nova Scotia, won 23 games in a row (moving her into fifth place for the most consecutive games won in show history) with her run ending on May 6, 2022, having won US$560,983 (sixth in show history). She is the longest-running and highest-earning Canadian champion in Jeopardy!'' history. Roach was seeded third in the 2022 Tournament of Champions, behind Amy Schneider and Matt Amodio.

Ryan Long 

Ryan Long won 16 games in May and June 2022. His previous jobs include dishwasher, water ice truck driver, piano delivery guy, airport security worker, supermarket cashier, bouncer, street sweeper, warehouse laborer, package handler, office clerk, CCT operator, and rideshare driver.

Cris Pannullo

Cris Pannullo, a customer success operations manager from Ocean City, New Jersey, won 21 games in October, November and December 2022. His games were interrupted by the Tournament of Champions and Second Chance Tournament.

See also 
 Strategies and skills of Jeopardy! champions

References

External links 
Jeopardy top scoring players

 
Jeopardy! contestants
Jeopardy! contestants